The 1909–10 Army Cadets men's ice hockey season was the 7th season of play for the program.

Season
For the first time, Army played mostly against American colleges. Owing to the increased quality of their opposition as well as the lack of playing time the previous year, Army failed to win a single game this season and scored just 1 goal in 7 games.

Roster

Standings

Schedule and results

|-
!colspan=12 style=";" | Regular Season

† Army records the game as a 0–0 tie, however, contemporary news reports score the game as 1–0 in favor of Penn.Some Army records include a 0–1 loss to Princeton on January 5. The game was scheduled but never played.

References

Army Black Knights men's ice hockey seasons
Army
Army
Army
Army